Kethan Savage (born September 4, 1993) is an American professional basketball player who last played for the Westchester Knicks of the NBA G League. He played college basketball for George Washington and Butler.

High school career
Savage attended Chantilly High School for two years before transferring to Episcopal High School in Alexandria, Virginia. Savage led Episcopal to its first league championship since 1998 as a junior by hitting the decisive three pointer. As a senior, he averaged 19.7 points, 5.8 rebounds and 4.2 assists per game. Savage led the team to a 24-4 record a place in Virginia’s independent schools championship game.

College career
With George Washington, Savage came off the bench to average 3.1 points per game as a freshman. He increased his scoring to 12.7 points per game as a sophomore but was injured late in the season and did not play in the 2014 NCAA tournament. As a junior, Savage averaged 11.7 points, 4.8 rebounds and 2.7 assists per game. After the season he announced he was transferring to Butler and sat out the year as a redshirt. He had off-season shoulder surgery and missed Butler's first four games due to pneumonia. He played in his first NCAA Tournament in 2017 although he was limited by a sore Achilles tendon. In his senior season, Savage averaged 8.0 points, 2.7 rebounds, and 1.5 assists per game while shooting 44.3 percent from the floor and 29.2 percent from behind the arc.

Professional career
Savage was selected with the 26th pick in the first round of the 2017 NBA G League Draft by the Raptors 905. He was the only draft pick by the Raptors 905 to actually make the team. Savage played two games for the Oklahoma City Blue in the 2018-19 season before being acquired by the Westchester Knicks. He subsequently played for the Blue. In 2021, Savagoe joined the Guelph Nighthawks of the Canadian Elite Basketball League and averaged nine points per game. In October 2021, he joined the Westchester Knicks after a successful tryout.

References

External links
 Butler Bulldogs bio

1993 births
Living people
American expatriate basketball people in Canada
American men's basketball players
Basketball players from Virginia
Butler Bulldogs men's basketball players
George Washington Colonials men's basketball players
Guelph Nighthawks players
Oklahoma City Blue players
Point guards
Raptors 905 players
Sportspeople from Fairfax, Virginia
Westchester Knicks players